Heinrich Peer (25 November 1867 – 13 May 1927) was an Austrian stage and film actor. He appeared in around a hundred films during the silent era.

Selected filmography
 Where Is Coletti? (1913)
 The Blue Mouse (1913)
 The Love of Hetty Raimond (1917)
 Carmen (1918)
 The Beggar Countess (1918)
 Midnight (1918)
 The Gambler (1919)
 The Face Removed (1920)
 The Law of the Desert (1920)
 The Princess of the Nile (1920)
 Eternal River (1920)
 The Night at Goldenhall (1920)
 Demon Blood (1920)
 Fanny Elssler (1920)
 Count Varenne's Lover (1921)
 Off the Rails (1921)
 Parisian Women (1921)
 The Convict of Cayenne (1921)
 The Railway King (1921)
 Tania, the Woman in Chains (1922)
 Maciste and the Silver King's Daughter (1922)
 Count Festenberg (1922)
 Two Worlds (1922)
 Prashna's Secret (1922)
 Circus People (1922)
 The Lady and Her Hairdresser (1922)
 Fräulein Raffke (1923)
 Zaida, the Tragedy of a Model (1923)
 The Evangelist (1924)
 Garragan (1924)
 Heart of Stone (1924)
 The Venus of Montmartre (1925)
 Bismarck (1925)
 People in Need (1925)
 The Old Ballroom (1925)
 The Master of Death (1926)
 The Bohemian Dancer (1926)
 Lace (1926)
The Black Pierrot (1926)
 Lace (1926)
 The Mill at Sanssouci (1926)
 Bismarck 1862–1898 (1927)
 The Gypsy Baron (1927)

References

Bibliography
 Hardt, Ursula. From Caligari to California: Erich Pommer's life in the International Film Wars. Berghahn Books, 1996.

External links

1867 births
1927 deaths
Austrian male film actors
Austrian male silent film actors
20th-century Austrian male actors
Austrian male stage actors
Male actors from Vienna